Ysgol Penglais School is an 1118 comprehensive school situated in the town of Aberystwyth, Ceredigion, West Wales. It offers education to approximately 1,100 pupils aged 11 to 18. The school was established in 1973 and teaches mainly through the medium of English.

Estyn Reports 
An Estyn report following an inspection in March 2019 stated "Ysgol Penglais is judged to have made sufficient progress in relation to the recommendations following the most recent core inspection." "As a result, Her Majesty’s Chief Inspector of Education and Training in Wales is removing the school from the list of schools requiring significant improvement." The previous Estyn report in 2018 had judged the school to be "in need of significant improvement".

Around 14% of pupils speak Welsh as the predominant language at home, and 21% speak Welsh fluently.

Charity events 
Penglais School has supported many charities in the past, long standing support has been made for the Sudan appeal. In April 2007, a huge event took place involving the entirety of the student body collecting on the main playing field to form the shape of the world. This event raised money for the Send my friend to school charity and aimed to increase awareness for the Global Campaign for Education. The event was photographed by the Royal Commission on the Ancient and Historical Monuments of Wales.

Notable former pupils 
 Tom Bradshaw, footballer
 Taron Egerton, actor
 Andy John, Bishop of Bangor (2008–present)
Rhys Norrington-Davies, footballer
 Malcolm Pryce, author
 Jane Stanness, actress

References

External links 
 

Secondary schools in Ceredigion
Buildings and structures in Aberystwyth
Educational institutions established in 1973
1973 establishments in Wales